Welborne is a village and former civil parish, now in the parish of Brandon Parva, Coston, Runhall and Welborne, in the South Norfolk district, in the county of Norfolk, England. In 1931 the parish had a population of 147. 

Its church, All Saints, is one of 124 existing round-tower churches in Norfolk.

History 
The villages name means 'spring stream'. On 1 April 1935 the parish was abolished and merged with Runhall.

References

External links
Welborne Village Website
All Saints on the European Round Tower Churches website

Villages in Norfolk
Former civil parishes in Norfolk
South Norfolk